A42 may refer to :
 A42 road (England), a road connecting Kegworth and Appleby Magna
 A42 road (Northern Ireland), a road connecting Maghera and Carnlough
 A42 motorway (France), a road connecting Lyon and Pont-d'Ain
 A 42 motorway (Germany), a road connecting Kamp-Lintfort and Castrop-Rauxel
 A-42 motorway (Spain), a road connecting Madrid and Toledo

A.42 may refer to :
 Aero A.42, a Czechoslovakian bomber aircraft of 1929 that was only ever produced in prototype form
 A42 tank, a British War Office designation for the "Heavy Churchill" (Mk.XIII) tank